Alexander Wetterhall (born 12 April 1986) is a Swedish road bicycle racer and mountain biker.

Career
Born in Gislaved, Wetterhall was born with dysmelia of his feet, which needed several surgeries to be corrected.

He was the winner of the Swedish National Time Trial Championships in 2009, and 2016. Wetterhall is also a former winner of the Rás Tailteann, and the Ronde van Drenthe races.

For the 2014 season, Wetterhall joined the new Firefighters Upsala CK team. In November 2014 he was announced as part of the squad for the new Swedish outfit  for the 2015 season.

Major results
Source: 

2004
 1st  Time trial, National Junior Mountain Bike Championships
2007
 1st  Team relay, National Mountain Bike Championships
2008
 National Mountain Bike Championships
2nd Time trial
3rd Cross-country
3rd Team relay
2009
 1st  Time trial, National Road Championships
2010
 1st  Overall Rás Tailteann
 1st Stage 1 Ringerike GP
 2nd Västboloppet
 4th Lincoln International GP
2011
 3rd Time trial, National Road Championships
 6th Overall Boucles de la Mayenne
2012
 3rd Time trial, National Road Championships
 5th Paris–Troyes
 8th Tallinn–Tartu GP
 10th Tartu GP
2013
 1st Ronde van Drenthe
2014
 National Road Championships
2nd Time trial
2nd Road race
2015
 2nd Time trial, National Road Championships
 3rd Overall Tour du Loir-et-Cher
2016
 1st  Time trial, National Road Championships
2017
 National Road Championships
2nd Time trial
3rd Road race
 9th Overall East Bohemia Tour

References

External links

Swedish male cyclists
1986 births
Living people
People from Gislaved Municipality
Rás Tailteann winners
Sportspeople from Jönköping County